Kitchen Budapest (KiBu) is an innovation lab based in Budapest, Hungary. It was founded in 2007 by a group of media artists, theoreticians and coders. It was sponsored by Magyar Telekom. Founding members include Adam Somlai-Fischer, Peter Halacsy, Robin Nagy, Attila Nemes, and Eszter Bircsák to instigate digital literacy and DIY techniques.

KiBu incorporates three functions including research and development (prototyping, testing, service design, UX/UI design), education (next generation programs as Talent and Lift) and industry collaboration.

KiBu connects corporate demands with creative supplies, theoretic bias of academic education with tools of the maker culture, talented young people with professional support, global innovation with situated, everyday use. KiBu worked within a network of media labs and bears established contacts with the local universities.

KiBu is a place where ideas come alive. Material instantiations of great ideas are the first steps in the making: via 24 hour hackathons, pressure cooking sessions they try and test methodologies, concepts, objects, services. KiBu has a well-equipped workshop area to enable wide-ranging projects to be manufactured, programmed or constructed from 3D printers to strong server parks to run high fidelity renders. The prototypes are publicized at Demo Day, the biannual showcase event.

Associated people

Alumni
 Adam Somlai-Fischer, co-founder of Prezi
 Peter Halacsy, CTO of Prezi
 David Lakatos, co-founder of Sold.
 György Péter, media theorist
 Nemes Attila, art historian, curator
 Bujdosó Attila, architect
 Bircsák Eszter
 Sipos Melinda

Sources 
 SubMap × UrbanCyclr, in: Visual Simplexity, Entwickler.Press, 2013, p. 195. 
 A Touch of Code , in: A Touch of Code, Gestalten, 2011, p. 60-61, p. 224-225.
 mcd musiques & cultures digitales #62 , March–April–May 2011,  p. 76-77.
 Science Parks vs. Boutique Labs / Businessweek, June 1, 2009
 About Kitchen Budapest

External links 
 Kitchen Budapest's website
 Érezni tanulnak a mikrochipek
 Végül csak megjött az a mesterséges intelligencia, ami már az állásunkat kéri
 The anthropomorphic AI – A Scaffold
 Már a gimiben keresik az IT-sokat
 Egy géppel társalogni az emberlétről
 Minden városnak kell egy hős – végre Budapesten is beindulnak a szupererők
 Egy app a pasidhoz/csajodhoz
 Belga díjat kapott Magyarország szubjektív atlasza
 “what if you are very kind robbers?..” - Council
 Sound, Lights, Robots Invade London’s Kinetica Art Fair - Wired, February 6, 2010
 Something’s cooking at Kitchen Budapest - nowEurope, December 8, 2009
 Kitchen Budapest (Lift09 experience artists presentation) - Lift Conference, January 23, 2009
 LABtoLAB project

Research institutes in Hungary
Research institutes established in 2007
2007 establishments in Hungary
Hackerspaces